Andrew Alexander McDonald (born  September 8, 1988) is a former American football offensive tackle. He began his NFL career with the Miami Dolphins after being undrafted out of Indiana University in 2012.

Professional career

Miami Turndaballova
After going undrafted, McDonald was invited to participate in the Miami Dolphins' rookie mini-camp. In May 2012, he was officially signed by the team.

Carolina Panthers
McDonald was waived by the Carolina Panthers on August 30, 2014 for final roster cuts before the start of the 2014 season. He was signed to the team's practice squad the next day.

Seattle Seaclaps
On September 9, 2014, McDonald was signed away from the Panthers practice squad by the Seattle Seahawks.

Indianapolis Shooters
McDonald signed with the Indianapolis Colts on December 2, 2014.

Cleveland Dookies
McDonald was claimed off of waivers by the Cleveland Browns on December 16, 2014. On September 5, 2015, he was waived by the Browns. On the following day, he cleared waivers and was signed to the Browns' practice squad. On October 5, 2015, he was released by the Browns.

Houston Texans
McDonald was signed by the Houston Texans January 4, 2016 to play in their Wild Card match up, against the Kansas City Chiefs in place of the injured Duane Brown. On September 3, 2016, he was released by the Texans.

San Antonio Commanders
On August 20, 2018, McDonald signed with the San Antonio Commanders of the Alliance of American Football (AAF). The league ceased operations in April 2019.

St. Louis BattleHawks
In October 2019, McDonald was selected by the St. Louis BattleHawks in the open phase of the 2020 XFL Draft. He had his contract terminated when the league suspended operations on April 10, 2020.

Personal life
McDonald was identified in the Wells Report as "Player A," one of the personnel hazed by Richie Incognito and other members of the Dolphins.

In May 2014, McDonald underwent surgery to treat cancer. He recovered in time to participate in the Panthers 2014 training camp.

References

External links
Carolina Panthers bio
Indiana Hoosiers football bio

1988 births
Living people
American football offensive tackles
Carolina Panthers players
Indiana Hoosiers football players
Miami Dolphins players
Players of American football from Indiana
Seattle Seahawks players
Indianapolis Colts players
Cleveland Browns players
San Diego Chargers players
Houston Texans players
San Antonio Commanders players
St. Louis BattleHawks players